Aarøy is a Norwegian surname. Notable people with the surname include:

Johannes Aarøy (1910–1984), Norwegian civil servant
Tor Hogne Aarøy (born 1977), Norwegian footballer

Norwegian-language surnames